George Henry Marriott (5 September 1886 – 24 September 1964) was a member of the Queensland Legislative Assembly.

Biography
Marriott was born in Brooyar, Queensland, the son of George Henry Marriott Snr and his wife Helen (née McKay). He was educated at Kholo State School, and after he finished his education worked at the Brisbane City Council power station.

On 23 July 1910, he married Annie Julia Olufson (died 1960) and together had four daughters. Marriott died at Chermside in  September 1964  and was cremated at the Mt Thompson Crematorium.

Public career
Marriott, a member of the Labor Party, was a representative on the Brisbane Trades and Labour Council, a secretary on the Brisbane sub-branch of the Federated Engine Drivers and Firemen's Association, and a councillor on the Balmoral Shire Council before entering state politics. He unsuccessfully stood for the seat of Bulimba at the 1920 before winning the seat 18 years later at the 1938 Queensland state election.

In November 1941, Marriott, along with George Taylor, the member for Enoggera, was expelled from the Labor Party when he was told "he had left the party" for supporting the Australian-Russian Association and joining in a campaign to supply sheepskins to Russia. He continued on in parliament as an independent Labor member until his defeat by official Labor candidate Robert Gardner at the 1950 state election.

Marriott was a member of the Bulimba Kindergarten Committee, the Church of England Diocesan Synod, and the Freemasons.

References

Members of the Queensland Legislative Assembly
1886 births
1964 deaths
Australian Labor Party members of the Parliament of Queensland
20th-century Australian politicians